Derek Wong (born Wong Zi Liang, traditional Chinese: 黃梓良, 13 January 1989) is a retired Singaporean badminton player. Wong is a two-time Olympian, who took part at the 2012 and 2016 Summer Olympics, where he was flag bearer in the latter's Parade of Nations.

Early life 
Wong was born on 13 January 1989, in Singapore, to parents Wong Shoon Keat and Irene Lee. He grew up in a badminton-loving family with three other brothers (Shawn, Jamie and Jason). Both his parents are former national champions and they own a badminton shop at the old Singapore Badminton Hall. Wong started playing badminton, at age 5 when his father took him to the hall to play badminton for the first time. Since then, he would do his school homework at the shop before playing badminton with some friendly uncles in the hall till his parents closed the shop for the day.

Wong turned professional in 2008 after consulting with his parents and peers, right after his O-levels.

Career

2011 World Championships 
Wong shocked Indonesia's Taufik Hidayat, a former Olympic champion in the second round of the World Championships. He defeated the Indonesian star 21–17, 21–14 to earn a place in the third round against Hans-Kristian Vittinghus of Denmark.

2011 Southeast Asian Games 
Wong upset Vietnam's Nguyễn Tiến Minh, then ranked in the world's top 10, at the quarterfinals of the Sea Games. He also came agonisingly close to upsetting the eventual gold medalist, Simon Santoso, in the next round. He led in the early stages of the semifinal match before succumbing to the Indonesian in straight sets.

2012 London Olympics 
Wong's Olympic debut ended after a 21–17, 21–14 loss to Jan Ø. Jørgensen in his final Group I match at London's Wembley Arena on 31 July to finish second in the three-man group. "Of course, I wanted to play more games instead of just two. But being in my first Olympics has been a huge experience, and one that I will use for my career," Wong said afterwards. He had earlier beaten Israel's Misha Zilberman 21–9, 21–15 on 29 July.

2014 Commonwealth Games 
Wong advanced to the men's singles final but lost to Parupalli Kashyap of India 14–21, 21–11, 21–19, winning a silver medal.

2016 Rio Olympics 
Wong qualified for the 2016 Summer Olympics and was the Singaporean flag bearer. During group play, he finished in second place in his group and did not advance.

Retirement 
After the 2016 Olympics, Wong resigned from the Singapore Badminton Association (SBA), thus confirming his retirement from professional badminton. He later joined consulting firm Deloitte on 26 September 2016, to start his post-badminton career. Wong is also looking to groom the next generation of shuttlers by opening his own badminton academy in the near future.

Personal life 
Wong started dating his fellow national shuttler Vanessa Neo in 2007 when he joined the national squad full-time. They got married in May 2015 and have two children together.

Awards 
Wong received the 2013, 2015 and 2017 Meritorious Award from the Singapore National Olympic Committee.

Achievements

Commonwealth Games 
Men's singles

Southeast Asian Games 
Men's singles

BWF International Challenge/Series 
Men's singles

Men's doubles

  BWF International Challenge tournament
  BWF International Series tournament

References

External links
 
 
  (2010)
  (2014)
 
 
 
 

1989 births
Living people
Singaporean sportspeople of Chinese descent
Singaporean male badminton players
Badminton players at the 2012 Summer Olympics
Badminton players at the 2016 Summer Olympics
Olympic badminton players of Singapore
Badminton players at the 2010 Commonwealth Games
Badminton players at the 2014 Commonwealth Games
Commonwealth Games silver medallists for Singapore
Commonwealth Games bronze medallists for Singapore
Commonwealth Games medallists in badminton
Badminton players at the 2014 Asian Games
Asian Games competitors for Singapore
Competitors at the 2007 Southeast Asian Games
Competitors at the 2009 Southeast Asian Games
Competitors at the 2011 Southeast Asian Games
Competitors at the 2013 Southeast Asian Games
Competitors at the 2015 Southeast Asian Games
Southeast Asian Games silver medalists for Singapore
Southeast Asian Games bronze medalists for Singapore
Southeast Asian Games medalists in badminton
Medallists at the 2014 Commonwealth Games